Galebekwe Virginia Tsotso Tlhapi (born 1979 or 1980) is a South African politician currently serving as the MEC for Economic Development, Environment, Conservation and Tourism in the North West. She had previously served as the MEC for Arts, Culture, Sports and Recreation. She is a member of the North West Provincial Legislature for the African National Congress.

Political career
Tlhapi is a member of the African National Congress and a former member of the African National Congress Youth League. She is the former  acting chairperson of the ANC Youth League in the North West, a former member of the regional executive committee of the ANC Youth League in the Bojanala region, and a former member of the mayoral committee for Local Economic Development in the Bojanala District Municipality. Tlhapi was sworn in as a member of the North West Provincial Legislature on 2 August 2016.

Following the 2019 national and provincial elections, she was appointed as the Member of the Executive Council for Arts, Culture, Sports and Recreation in the North West Provincial Government by premier Job Mokgoro.

On 22 November 2022, Tlhapi was appointed MEC for Economic Development, Environment, Conservation and Tourism.

References

External links

Living people
Year of birth missing (living people)
Tswana people
African National Congress politicians
Members of the North West Provincial Legislature
Women members of provincial legislatures of South Africa